Fort-Dauphin (Malagasy Tolagnaro or Taolagnaro) is a city (commune urbaine) on the southeast coast of Madagascar. It is the capital of the Anosy Region and of the Taolagnaro District. It has been a port of local importance since the early 1500s. A new port, the Ehoala Port was built in 2006–2009. Fort-Dauphin was the first French settlement in Madagascar.

Location 
Fort-Dauphin was initially situated on a short, narrow peninsula on the extreme southeastern coast of Madagascar. It has since grown to cover a much greater area along the ocean, almost to Mount Bezavona.

Roads
 the National Road 12a, from Fort-Dauphin to Vangaindrano.
 the National Road 13, from Fort-Dauphin to Ambovombe and Ihosy.

Airport
Tolagnaro Airport

Seaport
 Port d'Ehoala

Climate 
Fort-Dauphin has a tropical rainforest climate, though it is less rainy than areas further north on the eastern Malagasy coast. Being closer to the centre of the subtropical anticyclones than other parts of Madagascar, most rainfall is orographic, and tropical cyclones are not as common as in more northerly parts of the island.

History 

The bay of Fort-Dauphin was found by a Portuguese Captain in 1500. Fort Dauphin was founded on an Antanosy village, Taolankarana, in 1643 by the French East India Company who built a fort there named in honor of the crown prince, the future Louis XIV of France. It was settled by around a hundred colonists, who found themselves involved in the local politics. The poor trade results (some ebony and little more was obtained) hardly justified the difficulties of the settlers, who suffered from tropical illnesses and other problems. After a conflict with the Antanosy people, the survivors were evacuated in 1674.

One Governor of this colony, Étienne de Flacourt, published the History of the Great Isle of Madagascar and Relations, which was the main source of information on the island for Europeans until the late 19th century.

After World War II and until Didier Ratsiraka took the presidency in 1975, Fort Dauphin had a thriving community of Malagasy, French, Chinese and Pakistani merchants with adequate roads connecting the city to Toliara to the west and Fianarantsoa to the west and then north.  The port provided a means of exporting cattle to Mauritius and importing various goods from France and elsewhere. During the time Philibert Tsiranana was President of Madagascar, he enjoyed flying down to Fort Dauphin.

In 1975, the French businesses were nationalized, French citizens’ assets were frozen and several were briefly imprisoned.

Modern era 

Since the early 1970s, Fort Dauphin suffered an economic decline due to lack of good road connections to the rest of the country, rendering its port of local importance only. This in spite of significant foreign exchange earned from the export of live lobster (250 to over 350 tonnes per year from 1990 to 2005), and sapphires.

The Anosy area around Fort-Dauphin is currently undergoing a massive transformation associated with the development of a new ilmenite mine by the QIT Madagascar Minerals.  
A new port d'Ehoala, 10 km west of Tolagnaro has been built. 
These are the first major investments in the region's infrastructure for many decades.

Today there are a large variety of international non-governmental organizations with offices in Tolagnaro.

Religion
The mayority of its population are Christian, though almost all religions practised in Madagascar are found in Fort-Dauphin.
 FJKM - Fiangonan'i Jesoa Kristy eto Madagasikara (Church of Jesus Christ in Madagascar)
 FLM - Fiangonana Loterana Malagasy (Malagasy Lutheran Church)
 Roman Catholic Diocese of Tolagnaro 
 FFPM - (United Pentecostal Church of Madagascar)
 EEM Eklesia Episkopaly Malagasy (Anglican Church of Madagascar)
 Eglise Rhema Terre de Sel

Fort Dauphin was the headquarters of American Lutheran missionaries American Lutheran Church who worked in southern Madagascar (see Malagasy Lutheran Church) starting in 1888 for almost 100 years.

The Lutheran missionaries also traded land above the original Fort Dauphin harbor for what was then a sand dune. There is also a section of the town's cemetery where quite a few American Lutheran missionaries and several others are buried.

Ecology 
 Andohahela National Park is within driving distance of 40 km to the North West from Fort-Dauphin.
 Berenty Reserve
 Tsitongambarika reserve

Education
There are 161 public primary schools in the district of Fort-Dauphin, furthermore 8 colleges and 1 public Lycée.

Private schooling:  32 primary schools, 5 colleges and 2 lycées.

Gallery

Historic Timeline 
[no mention of Fort-Dauphin before the 1500s]

16th century

Bay of Fort-Dauphin discovered by the Portuguese 
1500 – Diogo Dias, captain of a Portuguese ship which was part of a fleet of 13 ships commanded by Pedro Álvares Cabral, sailing from Lisbon to the East Indies, became separated from the fleet on May 23 west of the Cape of Good Hope (South Africa) and was blown south. In sailing back north to rejoin his fleet, on August 10 he and his crew become the first Europeans to see Madagascar, somewhere near what was to become Fort Dauphin in Anosy. Dias named the island São Lourenço (Saint-Laurent in French) in honor of the Feast of São Lourenço held on that day.
1506 – Fernando Soares, a Portuguese explorer sailing back to Portugal from India, sailed past what was to become Fort Dauphin (now Tolagnaro) harbor. While his ship was hit by lightning during his passage, he didn't anchor there.
1508 – Captain Diogo Lopes de Sequeira of Portugal, faced with a storm while off the coast of Anosy, sought shelter behind a small peninsula which provided an anchorage that was well protected by the wind. Here they were also able to buy cattle, wild boar, yams and rice from the local Malagasy, who they found to be very friendly. This site was called Taolanara, and became a stopping off point for European ships on their way to and from India.

17th century

Initial French attempt to set up a Colony in Fort Dauphin, Anosy (1642–1674) 
1642 – First French colonial settlement in Anosy established by the French East India Company at Manafiafy, on the coast 40 km. northeast of Tolagnaro.
1643 – After 26 of the 40 settlers died within the first several months in Manafiafy, the French settlement was moved to a peninsula overlooking what was known as the Tolanaro bay and was named Fort Dauphin.
1645?- Pronis, Fort Dauphin's commander, married Ramaka's niece, cementing trade relationships.
1646 – Mutiny by the settlers when Ramaka's family made the colony's stores their own. Pronis was held captive for 6 months, only released at the insistence of those on a passing Societe ship.
 Pronis seriously strained relationships with local Antanosy by killing a local roandria (prince)and enslaving 73 Malagasy he tricked into coming into the fort and then gave to the captain of the ship which had gotten him released. Governor Pronis sent 12 Frenchmen who had mutinied against him, together with several Malagsy women, to exile on Réunion, where they became the first foreign residents of that island.
1648 – Etienne de Flacourt arrived to become governor of Fort Dauphin, a post he held until 1655. One of his recommendations was the importance of mixed marriages in the colony's development. For a map of Anosy at this time created by Flacourt see. For his map of Fort Dauphin, see.
 First Lazarist missionaries, sent from France by St. Vincent de Paul, also arrived in Fort Dauphin. What they found was a Colony which was quite a few less in number than had originally arrived due to deaths from malaria, dysentery and warfare.
 As it was 5 years before the next Societe ship arrived and due to poor relationships with local inhabitants, Flacourt began to conduct cattle raids in Anosy. As his troops were the only ones armed with muskets, they also were requested to help settle local feuds.
1650 – For what Fort Dauphin looked like per Flacourt at this point in time, see the map above under "History."
1653 – Flacourt reinscribed the marble stone the Portuguese had used to mark their captain's grave at the Trano Vato and brought it back to Fort Dauphin. On the marble he reinscribed, "Oh newcomer, read our advice: it will be useful for you, yours and your life: beware of the locals. Farewell."
1655 – Flacourt returned to France for 5 years.
 Most of Fort Dauphin burned down during festivities celebrating the return of Governor Ponis.
 Two additional Catholic missionaries died as did three new ones who were en route from France.
1656 – Champmargou, Flacourt's replacement, arrived at Fort Dauphin to find the French had executed two roandria, but the Fort was burnt and Pronis was dead. In response Champmargou leads a ruthless attempt to conquer the local Antanosy, which only left those living at the Fort more isolated.
1658 – Flacourt's Histoire de la Grande Isle Madagascar is published for the first time in Paris.
1660 – Flacourt died during his return from Paris to Fort Dauphin when his ship was sunk by Corsairs.
1660s – While thousands of new colonists and troops arrived as part of the new Compagnie des Indes Orientales' efforts to rebuild Fort Dauphin, many in turn die from warfare and fever. However, the Compagnie's poor profits result to the Crown taking it over.
1663 – On Christmas Day, 4 adults and 15 children were baptized, but another Catholic missionary died soon thereafter.
1665–67 – By the time 9 new Catholic missionaries, 4 lay brothers and 2 Recollet farmers arrived in Fort Dauphin, it had a chapel, monastery and library.
1668 – Fort described as having two "bastions" on the north side which commanded the harbor, was 50 feet long by 26 feet wide with a main door which overlooked s small meadow to the west while the other door looked east towards the sea.
1670 – 200 remaining colonists left at Fort Dauphin living in a war-torn, hostile part of Anosy.
1671 – Death of La Case. Both his daughter and widow married other Frenchmen.
 Admiral de la Haye told King Louis XIV he should abandon Fort Dauphin.
1672 – In October the Dunkuerquoise anchored in Fort Dauphin's harbor, carrying amongst other things ?? French women who were being sent to Reunion to become wives of the French settlers there. They jumped ship, however, and were soon all married to the French settlers, who in turn divorced their Malagasy wives. This soured relationships with the Antanosy to the point that at midnight of Christmas that year, over half the French colony was massacred. The rest of the colony was either already in or fled to the fort where they stayed until a ship came to rescue them.
1674 – In September, almost two years later, the White Pigeon, a company ship, arrived and evacuated all the surviving settlers to Reunion.
1675 – A ship stopped at Fort Dauphin to find the settlement in ashes.
 French King Louis XIV decided to abandon the colony which by then over 30 years had resulted in about 4,000 French deaths (and most likely even more Malagasy) and cost its shareholders 10 million livres (over 1/7 the cost of what it took to build the Versailles Palace).
 While only 2 of a total of 37 French Catholic missionaries sent to Fort Dauphin by that time were able to return to France, by the time they left there were hundreds of baptized Antanosy, a French-Antanosy dictionary and a Catechism in the Antanosy language left behind.
 Fort Dauphin considered too dangerous a port to be used by the French for the next 60 years.
1697 – Abraham Samuel, Indian Ocean Pirate, a runaway mulatto slave from Martinique, whose pirate ship washed ashore in Fort Dauphin bay, occupied the abandoned fort and is identified by a local princess as the child she had borne to a Frenchman during the occupancy of the colony. Thus he is declared heir to the vacant throne of the kingdom, became king Samuel and, together with at least 45 other pirates, some who served as his bodyguards, he conducted both piracy of ships stopping in the harbor and engaged in warfare with a neighboring Antanosy kingdom after claiming rule over the old heartland of the Zafiraminy. This pirate settlement rivaled that of St. Mary for a brief period of time.

18th century 
1705 – Samuel's kingdom ends with his death.
1706 – A Dutch captain is unable to find out what happened to Abraham Samuel from the local Antanosy king.
1730 – Pirate Olivier Levasseur was captured near Fort Dauphin, taken to Reunion and hanged.
1745–61 – Fort Dauphin a Compagnie des Indes outpost.
1766–70 – A French naval officer reestablished a colony at Fort Dauphin, including an attempted agricultural concession at Fenoarivo???. In 1769 he introduced prickly pear cactus from Mexico to Fort Dauphin to protect the seaward side of the Fort from pirates and strong storms. In the next century it spread across southern Madagascar, as it became very popular as a way to enclose and protect both cattle and villages.

19th century 
1804 – French colony again at Fort Dauphin???
1818 – French post reestablished at Fort Dauphin.

Imerina Control of Fort Dauphin & some of the surrounding area (1825–1895) 
1825 – After Anosy was conquered by 4,000 Imerina soldiers, they entered the French garrison at Fort Dauphin where they tore down the French flag and raised the Imerina King Radama I's instead. The 5 French soldiers and 1 officer who were at the fort fled to an island off Manafiafy where they were rescued and sent to Isle St. Marie.
Imerina begin to extract taxes from the people living in Anosy. 
 Fort Dauphin had 800 Hova and some Sakalava troops for some time.
 Imerina occupation of parts of Anosy resulted in some of the Antanosy people moving west to the Onilahy valley near Bezaha.
1852 – A six-month siege of Fort Dauphin by the Antanosy was finally broken by Imerina reinforcements sent by Lambert who broke through to the town.
1869 – Ranovalona II, Queen of the Imerina, became a Christian, requiring her representatives around the country to build churches. Some time after this a church was built in Fort Dauphin by the Imerina living there, who eventually made attendance mandatory for those living in Fort Dauphin.
1880 – Two Malagasy Christian evangelists were sent by the London Mission Society south to Anosy where they began to work with the church there, eventually taking over leadership of it.
1888 – Having spent over 6 weeks travelling overland from Antananarivo, American Rev. John and Lena Hogstad, at that time sponsored by the Norwegian Mission Society (NMS), arrived in Fort Dauphin, accompanied by the Rev. Nilsen-Lund of the NMS, who helped them with their journey and to settle there before he left.
 Rev. Hogstad and his wife began work on establishing a Lutheran church in Fort Dauphin (work which eventually expanded to encompass all of Anosy, Androy and the Mahafaly regions), with significant numbers of American Lutheran pastors, evangelists, educators and medical staff working in southern Madagascar and eventually in the north and nationally as well for the next 100 years).
 Having been sent with the blessing of the Queen of Imerina, they were asked to start working with an existing Imerina congregation located just outside the fort which was located in the midst of where the Imerina lived. While they were supported by the Imerina Governor in these efforts, this support meant they were at least initially viewed as collaborators with the hated Imerina by the people of Anosy.
1889 – First 7 Antanosy youth baptized by Rev. Hogstad. Shortly thereafter the Hogstads began a Lutheran primary school, purchasing the liberation of Rabenjamina, a young local slave who'd been taught how to read and write in Antananarivo, who became the first teacher at this school. Before long Hogstad had also started an evangelist training school (though 8 of the 10 first students were either Betsileo or Imerina).
1890s – Over 1,500 tonnes of Caoutchouc (natural rubber) collected in Anosy region exported to Europe from Fort Dauphin. Some of it is used in the first tires made by Michelin.
1890 – French explorer Louis Catat described Fort Dauphin as follows: "On the peninsula that made up Fort Dauphin, there rose the fort and the French citadel: it covered an area measuring about a square kilometer and was situated on the flat part of the peninsula that sat on top of the cliffs... Landing there was absolutely impossible because of the high cliffs and on the ground the only place that natives might access had been protected by digging moats, raising walls and forming artillery posts in the shape of a circle, all of which made for a first class defense system. Thus for the natives the military post at Fort Dauphin was an impenetrable citadel... But all of that was abandoned and ... no one seems in a real hurry to redress this unfortunate event. With each step, behind almost every hut, one finds some heartbreaking memory of our former domination. To the north, outside of the former borders (of the Fort) rose the village of Fort Dauphin, an important settlement which counts about 200 huts."
1892 – London Mission Society ended their work in Fort Dauphin, having handed over leadership of their congregation to Rev. Hogstad.
1895 – For an in-depth explanation of Fort Dauphin at this time see Knight (1896), a reporter from The Times, who was sneaking into Madagascar to report on the French attempts to conquer the island. He described Fort Dauphin as a "little town of thatched huts [which] nestles in verdure; while on a bluff commanding the sea stands the old French fort, built at the time of their first occupation, in 1646—a strong place in its day, whose ruined walls surround the residence of the Hova Governor and the ill-equipped arsenal" (p. 10). He later described the town's streets as "narrow...bordered by little stalls" with no native art for sale, only "cheap hardware of Europe, cloth from America, native-made implements, pottery...fruits and vegetables" (p. 17). Most of the Antanosy men only wore a loin-cloth, some of them armed with both a shield and a spear. On the other hand, some of the Imerina people wore European dress while most wore a white "lamba" (shawl) and a broad-brimmed high-crowned Imerina hat.
 By this time the Fort Dauphin garrison had only 100 "listless and very unsoldierly-looking Hova soldiers, armed with rusty Sniders" and "was isolated and surrounded by enemies on all sides," their nearest Hova post 150 miles up the coast to the north (p. 13) in Vangaindrano, with the people in Anosy in open rebellion to Imerina rule. The town's French-owned stores had been pillaged. He indicated the 50 French residents in Fort Dauphin had been expelled January 16 at the Imerina Queen's order, leaving a Procter Brothers agent and a dozen other English and Germans and one Norwegian lady missionary.
 Permanent Catholic Missions started in Fort Dauphin, led by Paulist priests and the Sisters of Charity.
 Lutheran Boarding School was established in Fort Dauphin for girls (moved to Manafiafy in 1902, with another girls school established in Behara).
1897 – Lutheran Boarding School was established in Fort Dauphin for boys (moved to Manantantely in 1921, where there also was a mission printing press).

French Control of Anosy, including Fort Dauphin (1895–1960) 
1896 – Apostolic Vicariate of Madagascar established Apostolic Vicariate of Southern Madagascar, with its headquarters in Fort Dauphin (see Roman Catholic Diocese of Tôlagnaro for more information on the work of the Roman Catholic Church in Anosy.)

20th century 
early-1900s – Beginning of the export of Mica through Fort Dauphin.
1901 – The English Union-Castle Line ran regular ships from Cape Town to Tamatave, with a stopover in Fort Dauphin.
 Jenny (Swiss-German) family is one of the first Europeans to settle in Fort Dauphin, by 1901 having established a Swiss "house of business," initially exporting 4–5 million French francs per year of Caoutchouc from Fort Dauphin. However, this only lasted several years as the caoutchouc plants were pulled out by the roots in their harvesting.
1902 – First government hospital built in Fort Dauphin.
1904–05 – Rebellion by the Antaisaka against French rule in rural Anosy results in many of the expatriates living in the region along with many Malagasy Christians retreating to the by then rundown fort in Fort Dauphin. This revolt lasted for 5 months, eventually put down by French with aid from their Senegalese Tirailleurs.
 Anosy region suffered from both Smallpox and Locusts.
1909 – Lutheran school for Evangelists and a Seminary opened in Fort Dauphin.
1911 – First American Lutheran Missionary John Hogstad, by this time working with his wife in Manantenina, about 100 km north of Fort Dauphin, became very ill with Malaria and was carried down to Fort Dauphin for medical care, but died and is buried in the Lutheran Missionary part of the city's cemetery.
1915 – Miss Clara Dysland arrived in Fort Dauphin to open the American School for Lutheran Missionary children, with the old American School building (now a maternelle) and the Trano Vato (now the Hotel Mahavoky) built specifically for this in 1923. High school courses were added to the curriculum in 1930.
1926 – Cyclone severely damaged the government hospital.
1928 – Henry de Heaulme arrived in Fort Dauphin, having driven down from Tananarive in a Harley Davidson motorcycle with his wife and baby son in the side car. He established an office in Fort Dauphin with the intent to export mica and sisal from western Anosy (and eventually eastern Androy as well) through Fort Dauphin.
1940 – Vichy France took over control of Madagascar.
 Mica exported from Fort Dauphin initially to Axis then to Allied countries.
1942 – In the Battle of Madagascar British forces replace Vichy France's control of Madagascar with that of the Free French, which included landing British soldiers in Fort Dauphin. With Free French in control of Madagascar, the Swiss Jenny family is imprisoned in Fort Dauphin and M. Seyrig, an Alsatian who was the Fort Dauphin Harbormaster at that time, was arrested and tortured by the French. He died in prison in Tananarive.
1947 – Short-lived attack in Fort Dauphin at the start of the Malagasy rebellion against the French. MDRM members living in Fort Dauphin were arrested and tortured by French authorities during this time. While many of the foreigners in Fort Dauphin slept either in the heavily guarded Jenny house or at the fort due to fear of an attack by rebels, this never happened.
1950s–60s –Exports of wild Castor Oil beans, cattle (10–30,000/year), lumber (over 1,000 m3/year, most of it hardwood), mica and sisal through Fort Dauphin port.
1956 – First Lycee built in Fort Dauphin, but due to what had historically been poor education in the area, only 30 students qualified for entry, even though the school was equipped to handle 400.
1957 – Construction of the SIFOR sisal weaving factory just outside Fort Dauphin.
1958 – Henri de Heaulme becomes president of the Provincial Assembly and vice-president of the National Assembly, urging independence for Madagascar. He is present with Philibert Tsiranana and Monja Jaona at the signing of the new Malagasy constitution.
 Beginning of the export of Rosy Periwinkle from Fort Dauphin.

Fort Dauphin becomes part of new Republic of Madagascar

First Republic 
1960 – Madagascar became an independent nation, with President Tsiranana describing the French residents on the island as the 16th Malagasy tribe.
1962 – 99 ships docked in Fort Dauphin, mainly for the export of sisal.
1963 – 105 Chinese living in Fort Dauphin
1965 – Population of Fort Dauphin is 11,800 and the population of the Antanosy in the Anosy region estimated to be 148,132.
 Port of Fort Dauphin was handling 30,000 tons per year.
1971 – Hundreds of MONIMA supporters, arrested and brought to Fort Dauphin from Androy due to their uprising against the Malagasy national, placed on a cargo ship and sent to prison on Nosy Lava.
1972–76 – Quite a few European foreign residents who had been conducting business in the Fort Dauphin and Amboasary regions forced to return to Europe when the Malagasy government refused to renew their visas as the Malagasy government shifted from being pro- to anti-French.

Second Republic 
1975 – Name of "Fort Dauphin" changed to "Tolagnaro" as part of President Didier Ratsiraka's revolution. But the municipality still uses today its name: Fort-Dauphin.
 Cyclone Deborah damages much of Anosy, including Tolagnaro, knocking out electricity and water supply for several days.
 President Ratsiraka orders the nationalization of foreign owned businesses, resulting in Jenny family moving back to Switzerland, their holdings in Fort-Dauphin nationalized. A year later the de Guitaut family turned over management of their sisal plantation to Imerina overseers, shuttered their house, and returned to France.
 Fort-Dauphin had Malagasy from all over the island living and working there, of which the Antanosy were not the majority. It also included many Tatsimo, Antandroy, mostly middle-class Malagasy from the highlands working in administration and business, as well as Europeans, Pakistanis, Creoles and Americans.
1978 – September: arrest  4 other foreigners who were held in the prison of Fort-Dauphin.
1979 – Imprisoned foreigners held until February.
1990s – Fort-Dauphin became a major tourist destination.
1990–2005 – 250 to over 350 tons/year of lobster exported from Fort-Dauphin.

21st Century 
2000 – Cholera outbreak in Fort-Dauphin.
2003 – Fort-Dauphin is the 3rd highest tourist destination in Madagascar, with 88,000 tourists traveling to Anosy.
 Joint French-Malagasy military exercises in Fort-Dauphin.
2004 – Air Madagascar began flights directly between Reunion and Fort-Dauphin.
2007 – Air Madagascar began a flight directly between Johannesburg and Fort-Dauphin.
2007 – Major Syphilis outbreak in Fort-Dauphin. State of Emergency is declared with up to 17.000 people (30% of the sexually active population) being infected.
2017-2020 - The town became popular stop over place for cruise ships. Though this broke down with the COVID pandemic.

See also
Abraham Samuel
Tolagnaro Airport

References

External links 

 Rio Tinto's QIT Madagascar Minerals
 Antanosy people
 Evangelical Lutheran Church in America: Global Mission Bibliography
 Regional office of Tourism - Anosy
 Fort-Dauphin sur WikiMapia

 
Cities in Madagascar
Populated places in Anosy
Regional capitals in Madagascar
Pirate dens and locations